The Reggiane Re.2002 Ariete ("Ram") was an Italian fighter-bomber developed during World War II. The aircraft was a further development of the Re.2000, with some of the modifications that already had been introduced in the Re.2001. The aircraft was mainly used by the Regia Aeronautica (Royal [Italian] Air Force), but it also saw limited use with the German Luftwaffe, who used it against the French resistance.

Design and development
The Re.2002 project began with the conversion of the Re.2000 to Regia Aeronautica specifications including a redesigned wing and conventional fuel tanks. A contract for a single conversion resulted in the Reggiane company using this as the basis of a new aircraft. The Re.2002 was designed by Roberto Longhi and Antonio Alessio, who took a modified and strengthened Re.2000 fuselage, mated to Re.2001 wings and a more powerful radial engine, the Piaggio P.XIX R.C.45 Turbine (1,175 hp).  The decision to go back to radial engines was partly made due to the difficulty in obtaining German made Daimler-Benz DB 601 engines and Longhi's preference for radial engines.

The first prototype flew in October 1940, approximately three months after the Re.2001. The evaluation period showed some reliability problems with the Piaggio engine and therefore the aircraft served primarily as an attack aircraft instead, as it could carry a considerable payload, by Italian standards.

Operational history
In September 1941, the Italian Air Force ordered 200 aircraft, delivery of which began in March 1942. The aircraft equipped the 5° Stormo and 50° Stormo, although the engine problems hadn't been fully solved. The first batch of 100 aircraft were delivered by July 1943, but only part of the second batch was delivered before the armistice with the Allies.

The squadrons equipped with Re.2002s saw a great deal of action with the Allied landings in Sicily although they also suffered many losses. During the first four days, when the Italian Air Force tried to attack allied ships, 14 aircraft were destroyed by British Spitfire Mk Vs. The Re.2002s damaged several allied ships, among them the British battleship , that was forced to retreat to the port of Malta for repairs. Allied bombing raids and strafing of airfields destroyed many aircraft on the ground. Due to the lack of fuel, the Re.2002s were only used sporadically, often equipped with one 250 kg and two 160 kg bombs.

Some of the last skirmishes against the Allies took place on September 3, 1943, when the British 8th Army landed at Calabria. Fifteen Re.2002s from 5° Stormo attacked the landing force. Three pilots were killed; among them was Giuseppe Cenni, the commander of the unit.
After the Armistice with the Allies, the Re.2002 was used in the Italian Co-belligerant Air Force. They bombed German ships en route to Corfu and saw action against German troops in the island of Cefalonia.

The Germans had shown interest in buying 300 Re.2002s before the Armistice. They planned to use the German produced BMW 801 radial engine in order to eliminate the deficiencies with the Piaggio engine, but Reggiane could not satisfy the demand, and none were delivered. However, some 40 "factory-fresh" Re.2002s along with 20 aircraft requisitioned from operational stocks were taken over by the Germans after the Italian armistice, and used against the French resistance. Some Re.2002s were used by units that fought on the Axis side after the Italian Government surrendered to the Allies.

Variants
There were some improvement studies, e.g. Re.2002 with Re.2005 wings, 18 examples of a dive bomber version were also made, one prototype was fitted with a Daimler-Benz DB 601 engine, and there was also a torpedo bomber prototype.

The Reggiane Re.2003 reconnaissance aircraft was derived from the Re.2002.

Operators

 Luftwaffe

 Regia Aeronautica
 Italian Co-Belligerent Air Force

Preserved aircraft
One Re 2002 (serial number MM8669) is on display at the Italian Air Force Museum at Vigna di Valle, having been restored to display condition in 2017. The restored fuselage of a Luftwaffe Re.2002 is on display as a monument for the resistance in the French city of Limoges.

Specifications (Re.2002)

See also

References

Notes

Bibliography
 Angelucci, Enzo and Matricardi, Paolo. Combat Aircraft of World War II: 1942-1943. New York: Military Press, 1988. .
 Berliner, Don. Surviving Fighter Aircraft of World War Two: Fighters. London: Pen & Sword Aviation, 2011. .
 Brindley, John F. "Caproni Reggiane Re 2001 Falco II, Re 2002 Ariete & Re 2005 Sagittario". Aircraft in Profile, Volume 13. Windsor, Berkshire, UK: Profile Publications Ltd., 1973, p. 217-241. .
 Caliaro, Luigino. "Database: Reggiane Re 2000, 2001, 2002 & 2005". Aeroplane, Volume 49, No. 2, February 2021. pp. 81–97. .
 
 Mondey, David. The Concise Guide to Axis Aircraft of World War II. New York: Bounty Books, 1996. .

Reggiane aircraft
1940s Italian fighter aircraft
World War II Italian fighter aircraft
Low-wing aircraft
Single-engined tractor aircraft
Aircraft first flown in 1940